Nahwa al-Majd  (Towards Glory) is an Egyptian 1949 romance film starring Hussein Sedki, Faten Hamama and Kamal Al-Shennawi. Hussein Sedki also directed the film.

Plot 
After Khalid's father abandons his family for another woman, Khalid falls in love with his friend Suhair. He struggles to overcome his personal challenges and consequently succeeds in graduating from a law school. He decides to take up the case of the workers in the farm owned by Suhair's family, causing a bitter relationship between him and Suhair's father. Khalid manages to win the case, and marries Suhair, who had supported him all along.

Cast 
Hussein Sedqi as Khalid
Faten Hamama as Suhair
Kamal Al-Shennawi as Khalid's father
Ahmed Allam
Mimi Chakib

References 
 Film summary, Faten Hamama's official site. Retrieved on December 30, 2006.

External links 
 

1949 films
1940s Arabic-language films
1940s romance films
Egyptian romance films
Egyptian black-and-white films